Harehills is an inner-city area of east Leeds, West Yorkshire  England.

Harehills may also refer to:

Hare Hills Tuff, a formation cropping out in Newfoundland, Canada
Harehill, a village in Derbyshire, England